Centrum Tigers is a basketball club based in Oslo, Norway. The team currently plays in first tier of Norwegian basketball and won the league back to back in 2016 and 2017.

Honours
BLNO
Champions (2): 2015–16, 2016–17

External links 
 Eurobasket.com Centrum Tigers Page

Basketball teams in Norway
Basketball teams established in 1987